Francisco Lopez y Palomino (active 18th century) was a Spanish painter. He studied in Madrid, and in 1759 joined the Royal Academy of San Fernando. He excelled chiefly in portraiture, although he also painted some genre pictures.

References 

18th-century Spanish painters
18th-century Spanish male artists
Spanish male painters